James Denton Thompson (20 July 1856 – 31 October 1924) was the Bishop of Sodor and Man from 1912 until his death in 1924.

Thompson was and educated at the Liverpool Institute and Corpus Christi College, Cambridge.  He was ordained in 1883  and held curacies at St James, Didsbury and St Saviour's, Liverpool. From 1886 to 1889 he was  Clerical Superintendent of the Church of England Scripture Readers’ Society. After this he held incumbencies in Bootle, North Meols and Birmingham before ordination to the episcopate.

In Birmingham, one of the most important parishes outside London, Thompson enhanced his reputation as a persuasive orator. ‘He was a vigorous speaker and preacher, with a carrying voice and plenty of appropriate gesture, accustomed to address meetings of men of all grades, while his spiritual influence was unmistakeable’.

Although regarded by the Archbishop of Canterbury as lacking in ‘refinement’, Prime Minister Asquith decided to recommend him for the see of Sodor and Man in November, 1911. There, the great open-air services attended by visitors played to his strengths. However, tourism came to a temporary halt with the declaration of war in August, 1914. Thompson was a strong advocate of British participation in the Great War, even though he realised some of the horrors that lay ahead ‘Horrible beyond all exaggeration are the agonies of mind and body produced by any war, but no imagination can conceive a thousandth part of the horrors of this great and terrible conflict .... If we had preferred peace to honour, or safety to truth, or ease to chivalry, the moral characteristic of the British Empire would have been strained and tarnished for ever.’  Thompson’s support for the War never wavered despite the enormous casualties and he opposed those seeking a negotiated peace. ‘But there can be no peace without victory. Not until the power of German militarism is defeated and broken for ever can the world hope for peace. This menace to the freedom and progress of the race must be crushed out of existence before the War can come to an end.’ 

Thompson died suddenly in Harrogate in October, 1924.

References

1856 births
People educated at Liverpool Institute High School for Boys
Alumni of Corpus Christi College, Cambridge
Bishops of Sodor and Man
20th-century Church of England bishops
1924 deaths
Clergy from Liverpool
Deans of Peel